Anderson is a Census-designated place (CDP) located within Mansfield Township, in Warren County, New Jersey, United States, that was created as part of the 2010 United States Census. As of the 2020 United States Census, the CDP's population was 306, a decrease of 36 (-10.5%) from the 342  enumerated at the 2010 census.

Geography
Anderson is located at  (40.761867,-74.929543). According to the United States Census Bureau, Anderson had a total area of 0.944 square miles (2.445 km2), including 0.941 square miles (2.436 km2) of land and 0.003 square miles (0.008 km2) of water (0.34%).

Demographics

Census 2010

References

Census-designated places in Warren County, New Jersey
Mansfield Township, Warren County, New Jersey